Jerrold Lewis Nadler (born June 13, 1947) is an American lawyer and politician who since 2023 has served as the U.S. representative for , which includes central Manhattan. A member of the Democratic Party, he was elected in 1992 to represent the state's 17th congressional district, which was renumbered as the 8th district from 1993 to 2013 and as the 10th district from 2013 to 2023. Nadler chaired the House Judiciary Committee from 2019 to 2023. In his 17th term in Congress, Nadler is the dean of New York's delegation to the House of Representatives. Before his election to Congress, Nadler served eight terms as a New York State Assemblyman.

Early life, education, and early political career 

Nadler was born into a Jewish family in Brooklyn, the son of Miriam (née Schreiber) and Emanuel "Max" Nadler. Nadler described his father as a "dyed-in-the-wool Democrat" who lost his poultry farm in New Jersey when the younger Nadler was seven. In his youth, he attended Crown Heights Yeshiva; he is the only member of Congress with a yeshiva education. He graduated from Stuyvesant High School in 1965 (where his debate team partner was the future philosopher of science Alexander Rosenberg, and Dick Morris managed his successful campaign for student government president).

Nadler received his B.A. in 1969 from Columbia University, where he became a brother of Alpha Epsilon Pi. After graduating from Columbia, Nadler worked as a legal assistant and clerk, first with Corporation Trust Company in 1970, then the Morris, Levin and Shein law firm in 1971. In 1972, Nadler was a legislative assistant in the New York State Assembly before becoming shift manager at the New York City Off-Track Betting Corporation, a position he held until becoming a law clerk with Morgan, Finnegan, Pine, Foley and Lee in 1976.

While attending evening courses at the Fordham University School of Law, Nadler was elected to the New York State Assembly in 1976. He completed his J.D. at Fordham in 1978.

New York State Assembly 

Nadler was a member of the New York State Assembly from 1977 to 1992, sitting in the 182nd, 183rd, 184th, 185th, 186th, 187th, 188th and 189th New York State Legislatures.

In 1985, he ran for Manhattan Borough President. He lost the Democratic primary to David Dinkins. In the general election, he ran as the New York Liberal Party nominee, and again lost to Dinkins.

In 1989, he ran for New York City Comptroller. In the Democratic primary, he lost to Kings County D.A. Elizabeth Holtzman.

Nadler founded and chaired the Assembly Subcommittee on Mass Transit and Rail Freight.

U.S. House of Representatives

Elections 

In 1992, Ted Weiss was expected to run for reelection in the 8th district, which had been renumbered from the 17th after the 1990 U.S. census. But Weiss died a day before the primary election. Nadler was nominated to replace Weiss. He ran in two elections on Election Day—a special election to serve the rest of Weiss's eighth term in the old 17th district, and a regular election for a full two-year term in the new 8th district. He won both handily, and has been reelected 15 times with no substantive opposition. In 2020 Nadler faced a primary challenge from activist Lindsey Boylan; the election was the first time in his tenure that Nadler received less than 75% of the vote. The district was renumbered the 10th district after the 2010 census. A Republican has not represented this district or its predecessors in over a century.

The 10th district includes Manhattan's west side from the Upper West Side down to Battery Park, including the World Trade Center; the Manhattan neighborhoods of Chelsea, Hell's Kitchen and Greenwich Village; and parts of Brooklyn, such as Coney Island, Bensonhurst, Borough Park and Bay Ridge. It includes many of New York City's most popular tourist attractions, including the Statue of Liberty, New York Stock Exchange, Brooklyn Bridge and Central Park.

In 2022, Nadler defeated his longtime colleague Carolyn Maloney in a three-way primary with 56% of the vote in New York's newly drawn 12th congressional district.

Tenure 

Nadler is the ranking member of the U.S. House Committee on the Judiciary and is a member of the Transportation and Infrastructure committees.

Despite earlier efforts to impeach George W. Bush and more recent requests from fellow representatives, he did not schedule hearings on impeachments for Bush or Dick Cheney, saying in 2007 that doing so would be pointless and would distract from the presidential election. In an interview in Washington Journal on July 15, 2008, Nadler reiterated the timing argument and endorsed Barack Obama in the 2008 presidential election, saying that electing an honest candidate would create a greater chance of prosecuting those in the Bush administration who had committed war crimes. Ten days later, after Representative Dennis Kucinich submitted Articles of Impeachment, the full House Judiciary Committee held hearings regarding the process covered solely by C-SPAN. A top Ronald Reagan Justice Department official, Bruce Fein, was among those testifying for impeachment.

On a similar note, referring to hypothetical impeachment proceedings against President Trump that would begin in the newly elected Democrat-controlled House, he suggested a "three-pronged test" that "would make for a legitimate impeachment proceeding". Such a test would include "the offenses in question must be so grave", and "the evidence so clear", that "even some supporters of the president concede that impeachment is necessary". If it was determined that the president committed an impeachable offense, lawmakers must consider if such an offense would "rise to the gravity where it's worth putting the country through the trauma of an impeachment proceeding," Nadler said.

On September 24, 2019, Representative Lance Gooden proposed a resolution to remove Nadler from his position as chair of the House Judiciary committee, accusing him of unlawfully beginning impeachment proceedings before the House had given the committee authorization.

For his tenure as chair of the House Judiciary Committee in the 116th Congress, Nadler earned an "A" grade from the nonpartisan Lugar Center's Congressional Oversight Hearing Index.

PolitiFact criticized Nadler for falsely claiming in the Kenosha unrest shooting that Kyle Rittenhouse had brought a gun across state lines and might thus be subject to a federal Department of Justice review, when in fact he had not.

Committee assignments

Current
 Committee on the Judiciary (Ranking member)

Former
 Committee on Transportation and Infrastructure
 Subcommittee on Highways and Transit
 Subcommittee on Railroads, Pipelines, and Hazardous Materials

Caucus memberships 
 Congressional Arts Caucus
 Congressional Progressive Caucus
 Congressional Asian Pacific American Caucus
 Medicare for All Caucus
 House Pro-Choice Caucus

Political positions

Surveillance 

Nadler was unhappy with the passage of the surveillance-reform compromise bill, the FISA Amendments Act of 2008, saying it "abandons the Constitution's protections and insulates lawless behavior from legal scrutiny".

Income taxes 

Nadler compared Obama's acceptance of Republican demands to extend Bush-era tax cuts at the highest income levels to someone's being roughed up by the mob, asserting that the Republicans would allow the middle class tax cut only if millionaires and billionaires receive a long-term tax cut as well.

Nadler has proposed changing the income tax brackets to reflect different regions and their costs of living, which would have lowered the tax rate for New Yorkers. He has opposed tax breaks for high-income earners, saying that the country cannot afford it.

Abortion 

Nadler has a 100% rating from NARAL Pro-Choice America.

Nadler sponsored the Freedom of Choice Act in 2004 and 2007. In 2009 he said he might soon reintroduce the bill.

LGBT rights 

Nadler supports same-sex marriage, and anti-discrimination protections on the basis of sexual orientation and gender identity.

On September 15, 2009, Nadler and two other representatives introduced the Respect for Marriage Act, a proposed bill that would have repealed the Defense of Marriage Act and required the federal government to recognize the validity of same-sex marriages.

In 2019, Nadler supported the Equality Act, a bill that would expand the federal Civil Rights Act of 1964 to ban discrimination based on sexual orientation and gender identity.

Immigration 

In March 2019, as the House debated President Trump's veto of a measure unwinding his declaration of a national emergency at the southern border, Nadler said: "I'm convinced that the president's actions are unlawful and deeply irresponsible. A core foundation of our system of government and of democracies across the world, going back hundreds of years, is that the executive cannot unilaterally spend taxpayer money without the legislature's consent."

Iran 

In 2015, Nadler voted to support an agreement to lift economic sanctions against Iran in exchange for Iran's compliance with the terms of the agreement which called for substantial dismantling and scaling back of their nuclear program.

Israel 

Of Trump's decision to recognize Jerusalem as the capital of Israel in December 2017, Nadler said, "I have long recognized Jerusalem as the historic capital of Israel, and have called for the eventual relocation of the United States Embassy to Jerusalem, the seat of the Israeli government. While President Trump's announcement earlier today rightly acknowledged the unique attachment of the Jewish people to Jerusalem, the timing and circumstances surrounding this decision are deeply worrying."

Housing 
In 2020, Nadler praised a judge for a ruling that could lead to the removal of 20 or more stories in an already constructed 52-story luxury high-rise building in the Upper West Side of New York City. The developer had received a permit to construct the building, but the judge said the permit should not have been given.

Cannabis 

In July 2019, Nadler introduced the Marijuana Opportunity Reinvestment and Expungement (MORE) Act that, among other reforms, seeks to remove cannabis from the Controlled Substances Act. He said: "It's past time to right this wrong nationwide and work to view marijuana use as an issue of personal choice and public health, not criminal behavior." In November 2019, the bill passed the House Judiciary Committee by a 24–10 vote, marking the first time that a bill to end cannabis prohibition had ever passed a congressional committee.

Voting record 

Nadler has a liberal voting record in the House. He gained national prominence during the impeachment of Bill Clinton, when he described the process as a "partisan railroad job".

His Medicare proposal includes a section that provides for a consortium of organization to study Ground Zero illness.

Personal life 
Nadler and Josephine Langsdorr "Joyce" Miller wed in 1976. As of 2013, they lived in Lincoln Square.

See also 
 List of Jewish members of the United States Congress

References

External links 

 Congressman Jerry Nadler official U.S. House website
 Jerry Nadler for Congress
 

 

|-

|-

|-

|-

|-

|-

|-

1947 births
20th-century American Jews
20th-century American politicians
21st-century American Jews
21st-century American politicians
American Jews from New York (state)
Columbia College (New York) alumni
Democratic Party members of the New York State Assembly
Democratic Party members of the United States House of Representatives from New York (state)
Fordham University School of Law alumni
Jewish members of the United States House of Representatives
Living people
People from Manhattan
Politicians from Brooklyn
Stuyvesant High School alumni
Trump–Ukraine scandal